was a feudal domain under the Tokugawa shogunate of Edo period Japan, located in Tanba Province in what is now the central portion of modern-day Kyoto Prefecture. It was centered around Ayabe jin'ya, which were located in what is now the city of Ayabe, Kyoto.

History
Kuki Moritaka, the son of the Sengoku period admiral, Kuki Yoshitaka had been awarded the 35,000 koku Toba Domain. On his death in 1632, a succession dispute arose. Yoshitaka had appointed his 5th son, Kuki Hisataka as his heir, but his third son, Kuki Takasue, argued that he had the stronger clam due to primogenitor and asked for the Tokugawa shogunate for arbitration. The shogunate ruled in favor of Hisataka, but also assigned a kokudaka of 20,000 koku to Moritaka to form a new domain. This was the start of Ayabe Domain. In 1661, Takasue assigned 500 koku of this estate to his younger brother Takashige. The Kuki clan continued to rule Ayabe until the Meiji restoration.

However, during the tenure of the second daimyō, a great flood and a storm caused 3729 deaths, and the domain's finances began to decline. Repeated floods and famines occurred, and despite attempts to reform the financial system, peasant revolts frequently occurred. A han school, the "Shintokukan", was established during the tenure of Kuki Takanao. The eighth daimyō, Kuki Takahiro, brought in outside advisors (including Satō Nobuhiro) to reform agricultural and military policies. A clan monopoly system on cotton from 1847 helped restore the domain's finances. The final daimyō, Kuki Takatomo had served Emperor Kōmei as a guard during the Kinmon incident and at the start of the Boshin War was one of the first supporters of the Meiji government. Following the Meiji restoration he was made viscount (shishaku) in the kazoku peerage.  In 1871, with the abolition of the han system, Ayabe Domain became "Ayabe Prefecture" and subsequently became part of Kyoto Prefecture.  The site of the Ayabe jin'ya is now the Kyoto Prefectural Ayabe Senior High School.

Holdings at the end of the Edo period
Most domains in the han system, which consisted of several discontinuous territories calculated to provide the assigned kokudaka, based on periodic cadastral surveys and projected agricultural yields. 

Tanba Province 
5 villages in Funai District
32 villages in Ikaruga District
25 villages in Amata District

List of daimyō 

{| class=wikitable
! #||Name || Tenure || Courtesy title || Court Rank || kokudaka 
|-
|colspan=6|  Kuki clan, 1633-1871 (Tozama)
|-
||1||||1633 - 1674||Shikibu-shōyū (式部少輔)|| Junior 5th Rank, Lower Grade (従五位下)||20,000 -> 19,500 koku
|-
||2||||1674 - 1698||Ōsumi-no-kami (大隅守)|| Junior 5th Rank, Lower Grade (従五位下)||19,500 koku
|-
||3||||1698 - 1713||Nagato-no-kami (長門守)|| Junior 5th Rank, Lower Grade (従五位下)||19,500 koku
|-
||4||||1713 - 1766||Bingo-no-kami (備後守)|| Junior 5th Rank, Lower Grade (従五位下)||19,500 koku
|-
||5||||1766 - 1780||Shikibu-shōyū (式部少輔)|| Junior 5th Rank, Lower Grade (従五位下)||19,500 koku
|-
||6||||1780 - 1787||Ōsumi-no-kami (大隅守)|| Junior 5th Rank, Lower Grade (従五位下)||19,500 koku
|-
||7||||1787 - 1808||Shikibu-shōyū (式部少輔)|| Junior 5th Rank, Lower Grade (従五位下)||19,500 koku
|-
||8||||1808 - 1822||Izumo-no-kami (出雲守)|| Junior 5th Rank, Lower Grade (従五位下)||19,500 koku
|-
||9||||1808 - 1861||Shikibu-shōyū (式部少輔)|| Junior 5th Rank, Lower Grade (従五位下)||19,500 koku
|-
|10||||1861 - 1871||Ōsumi-no-kami (大隅守)|| Junior 5th Rank, Upper Grade (従五位上)||19,500 koku
|-
|}

See also 
 List of Han
 Abolition of the han system

Further reading
 Bolitho, Harold. (1974). Treasures Among Men: The Fudai Daimyo in Tokugawa Japan. New Haven: Yale University Press.  ;  OCLC 185685588

References

Domains of Japan
1871 disestablishments in Japan
States and territories disestablished in 1871
Tanba Province
History of Kyoto Prefecture